The 2022 Chinese Champions League, officially known as the  Wisense Life 2022 Chinese Football Association Member Association Champions League for sponsorship reasons, was the 21st season since its establishment in 2002.

33 of the 50 member associations pre-elected 61 teams through leagues, cups or recommendations.

Following the 2021 season when Xinjiang PCC FA became new member association of the CFA and recommended club to enter the CMCL, this season, the new members, Federation of University Sports of China and Chinese Enterprise Sports Association also introduced 4 clubs to the CMCL.

Name Changes 
Baoding Rongyao F.C. changed its name to Baoding Xuecheng Athletic in February 2022.
Yunnan Yukun Steel F.C. changed its name to Yuxi Yukun in April 2022.
Jilin Senyang F.C. changed its name to Changchun Xidu in May 2022.

Qualificated Teams 
According to CMCL's Format & Rules, the leagues organised by the member associations should be round-robin tournament with more than 8 clubs, and at most 4 clubs are eligible to apply for CMCL. In fact, of the 57 teams (excludes 4 teams that entered the CMCL Finals last season), only 4 teams, Xiamen Lujian Tiancheng, Suzhou Deehero, Xinjiang Lingmengzhe, and Qingdao Great Star, fully complied with top 4 clubs in their leagues.

There are 7 teams, which were either competing in the city-level associations or directly recommended by them, then got the qualification of CMCL through the member associations (Fujian FA, Shandong FA and Anhui FA).

Italic in the Position column means the qualificated competition fixtures is still uncompleted.

Regional Competitions
The draw for the regional competitions took place on 2 June 2022.

Group A

Group B

Group C

Group D

Group E

Group F

Group G

Group H

Group I

Group J

Group K

Group L

Group M

Group N

Group O

Group P

Elimination round

First leg

Second leg

Finals

Group stage

Group A

Group B

Promotion play-offs

First round

Second round

Final

First leg

Second leg

References

External links

2022 in Chinese football leagues